Linsley Peninsula is a broad, roughly rectangular ice-covered peninsula which protrudes into the south part of Murphy Inlet, northern Thurston Island, Antarctica, dividing the inlet into two arms at the head. The peninsula was first plotted from air photos taken by U.S. Navy Operation Highjump, 1946–47, and was named by the Advisory Committee on Antarctic Names for Lieutenant Commander Richard G. Linsley, U.S. Navy, a pilot of LC-130 Hercules aircraft who made flights in support of the United States Antarctic Research Program geological party working at Thurston Island in the 1968–69 season.

Maps
 Thurston Island – Jones Mountains. 1:500000 Antarctica Sketch Map. US Geological Survey, 1967.
 Antarctic Digital Database (ADD). Scale 1:250000 topographic map of Antarctica. Scientific Committee on Antarctic Research (SCAR), 1993–2016.

References

Peninsulas of Ellsworth Land